Black Creek is a long source tributary of Nescopeck Creek so part of the Susquehanna River drainage basin. It is also the second & longer stream of the same name recognized by the USGS GNIS system in Luzerne County, Pennsylvania, in the United States—compared to the Black Creek beyond the ridgeline of the drainage divide, so in the Lehigh River valley and  Carbon County. The headwaters of both Black Creeks in Luzerne county are only a few miles apart, and both valleys were traversed by the Lausanne-Nescopeck Turnpike (Lehigh-Susquehanna Turnpike) in the first half of the 19th-century.
  

Course
Black Creek begins in Foster Township and flows southwest for less than a mile, passing through the community of Jeddo. The creek then enters Hazle Township, where it turns west and flows between two mountains, along the way passing through the community of South Ebervale. Further downstream, the creek leaves the two mountains and flows north of Hazleton, crossing Pennsylvania Route 940 and Pennsylvania Route 309, immediately after which it receives the tributary Little Black Creek. Slightly further downstream it enters West Hazleton, crossing Pennsylvania Route 93 and receiving the tributary Stony Creek, then crossing Interstate 81 in West Hazleton. Upon leaving West Hazleton, it reenters Hazle Township and continues west, soon crossing into Sugarloaf Township.  Here for a few miles it flows roughly parallel to the border between Sugarloaf and Hazle townships, then turns southwest and enters Black Creek Township, passing briefly through Hazle Township. In Black Creek Township, the creek continues west, passing through communities of Gum Run, Derringer, Fern Glen and Gowen. At Gowen it turns north and flows through a water gap, with Buck Mountain to the west. On the other side of the water gap, the creek flows through Rock Glen and picks up the tributary Falls Run. Continuing north for a few miles, it picks up tributaries Barnes Run and Scotch Run, then turns northeast for slightly over a mile, reaching its confluence with Nescopeck Creek near the community of Tank.

Hydrology
The entire length of Black Creek is considered by the Pennsylvania Department of Environmental Protection to be impaired by acid mine drainage, the main sources of which are the Gowen and Derringer deep mine discharges; a number of smaller sources of abandoned mine drainage also contribute to impairment of the Black Creek watershed.

The discharge of Black Creek is 769.33 gallons per minute in its upper reaches. By the Hazleton High School, it increases to 2253.6 gallons per minute and by the Hazleton Wastewater Treatment Plant it increases to 5109 gallons per minute. Downstream of the wastewater treatment plant, the discharge is 22787.5 gallons per minute; at the bridge at Tomhicken it is 31227.33 gallons per minute, and at the State Route 3020 bridge it is 31824.17 gallons per minute. Above and below the Gowen Discharge, the creek's discharge is 32659.33 and 46529.5 gallons per minute respectively. Upstream of the State Route 3018 bridge, the discharge is 55684.17 gallons per minute and near the mouth it is 53938.56 gallons per minute.

The pH of Black Creek in its upper reaches ranges from 6.1 to 6.4. At the Hazleton High School it ranges from 4.9 to 6 and at the Hazleton Wastewater Treatment Plant from 5.5 to 6. Downstream of the plant the pH ranges between 6.4 and 7. At the bridge at Tomhicken it ranges from 6.1 to 6.7 and at the State Route 3020 bridge from 6.2 to 6.8. Above and below the Gowen Discharge, the creek's pH ranges from 6.3 to 6.8 and 4.6 and 6.2 respectively. Upstream of the State Route 3018 bridge, the pH ranges from 4.6 to 6.3 and near the mouth between 4.6 and 6.8.

Chemical hydrology (aluminum, iron, manganese, and acidity) 

Geography and geology

Black Creek's topography is described in a 1921 book as "mountainous". The upper part of the creek is in a broad valley, the lower part in a narrow valley. There are some swamps in the upper reaches. The channel is sinuous, flowing through rock formations of sandstone and shale which include coal.

An area known as Black Creek Flats, situated along the creek near Hazleton, is on the Luzerne County Natural Areas Inventory, although damaged by mining in the past.

There is a cataract on Black Creek near Interstate 81. There are also strainers on the creek.

Watershed and recreation
Part of the watershed is drained by the Jeddo Tunnel, which discharges into Little Nescopeck Creek. Counties in the watershed include Luzerne County, Columbia County, and Schuylkill County. The creek's drainage basin is part of the lower North Branch Susquehanna River drainage basin.

It is possible to access the headwaters of Black Creek via Pennsylvania Route 309.

Black Creek flows through coal mining lands in its upper reaches and woodlands in its lower reaches. The creek is contaminated with runoff from Hazleton and coal mines, as well as with sewage and bacteria in its upper reaches.

Edward Gertler describes the scenery along the creek as "very good to poor" in his book Keystone Canoeing. Difficulty largely ranges from 1 to 4- with areas of 6. Gertler describes the creek as a "little-known whitewater wonder". Difficult rapids are found in the lower reaches among other places.

History
Coal mining has occurred in the watershed of Black Creek as well as watersheds of some of its tributaries such as Little Black Creek and Cranberry Creek.

In 1921, the three largest communities in the Black Creek watershed were Hazleton, Freeland, and West Hazleton, with populations of 25452, 6197 and 4715 respectively. Other communities in the watershed include Drifton, Jeddo, Rock Glen and Gowen, with 1921 populations of 2129, 377, 317 and 306 respectively.

In the early 1900s, the Pennsylvania Railroad followed Black Creek in its lower reaches. The Lehigh Valley railroad passed through the watershed's upper reaches. Main industries in the watershed at the time included coal mining and agriculture. Numerous tributaries of Black Creek were also used as water supply.

Biology
There are hemlocks in a glen in the lower reaches of Black Creek. Additionally, a number of species inhabit the Black Creek Flats, which are listed on the Luzerne County Natural Areas Inventory. These include the common roadside skipper, the seepage dancer, the bog copper, the Hartford fern, the elfin skimmer, the long dash, the eyed brown, and the Aphrodite fritillary.

See also
List of rivers of Pennsylvania
Little Nescopeck Creek

Notes

References

Rivers of Pennsylvania
Tributaries of Nescopeck Creek
Rivers of Luzerne County, Pennsylvania